Neorhizobius is a genus of beetles belonging to the family Coccinellidae.

Species:

Neorhizobius chilensis

References

Coccinellidae
Coccinellidae genera